Allen Milner (February 1, 1896 – March 11, 1938) was an American épée fencer. He competed at the 1924 and 1928 Summer Olympics.

References

External links
 

1896 births
1938 deaths
American male épée fencers
Olympic fencers of the United States
Fencers at the 1924 Summer Olympics
Fencers at the 1928 Summer Olympics
Sportspeople from Lafayette, Indiana